, known professionally as , is a Canadian-Japanese actress and model.

Personal life
Born in Nayoro, Hokkaido, Japan, her father is Canadian and her mother Japanese. While still a high-school student, she was scouted by Twin Planet Entertainment in Tokyo. In 2018, she appeared on the "Fall in Love♥Weekend Homestay" reality show broadcast on video streaming website, AbemaTV. That same year, she won the grand prize in a beauty contest run by VoCE Magazine (Kodansha Publishing) and became an exclusive model for said magazine. In February 2019, she was made an official Tourism Ambassador of her hometown, Nayoro in Hokkaido. In May 2021, she joined the Ken-On talent agency, taking the stage name Myra Arai.

Career
Since 2019, Arai has featured in a variety of magazines and fashion shows. She has also made several appearances in dramas, TV shows, music and online videos.

Appearances 
Movies
 The Great Yokai War: Guardians（released in Japan on August 13, 2021, by Toho and Kadokawa Pictures.）as "Rokurokubi"

Drama
 The Confession of the Sirens（Oct. 18, 2020～、WOWOW）as "Nakata Miku"
 SengokuchahanTV（Aug. 1, 2020～、TOKYO MX, etc.）
 Suicide Dance（peep） as "Riho Sanagi" (leading role)
 Shujinko（Sept. 2, 2019 - YouTube） - as "Yuri Koizumi" 
  Red Eyes Surveillance Squad: Episode 1（Jan. 23, 2021、Nihon Television） - as "Tomomi"
  Kamen Rider Genms -The Presidents-（broadcast on Toei Tokusatsu Fan Club April 11 & 18, 2021）as "Rin" 

TV
 Unbelievable on Fuji Television
 Rose-coloured Dandy on TOKYO MX
 SKATTO JAPAN: The Greatest Collection of Feel-good Stories on Fuji Television
 BeauTV〜VoCE on TV Asahi
 The Gift on Nihon Television
 Gyoretsu no Dekiru Horitsu Sodanjo on Nihon Television

Magazines
 「VoCE」 Exclusive model by Kodansha
 「bis」 by Kobunsha 
 「CanCam」 by Shogakukan
 「CM NOW」 by Genkosha
 「BOMB」 by Gakken Plus
 「SPA!」 by Fusosha
 「FLASH Special」 by Kobunsha

Fashion shows
GirlsAward
Kobe Collection
Kansai Collection
 Sapporo Collection

Internet TV
 Fall in Love♥Weekend Homestay on AbemaTV
 ImappoTV on AbemaTV
 Kudo Santa on AbemaTV
 Oruganzaka Seitokai on DHC Television

Music videos
PELICAN FANCLUB 『三原色』"Primary Colors"
佐藤千亜妃 (Chiaki Satoh) - 空から落ちる星のように (Like a Star Falling from the Sky)

References

External links 
 https://www.ken-on.co.jp/artists/arai/ Myra Arai - Ken-on (in Japanese)
 https://i-voce.jp/ VoCE Magazine (in Japanese)

Living people
2001 births